Tom Malar (born 26 August 1980) is a Czech R&B singer, songwriter and producer. He was labeled as the first successful Czech Soul/R&B artist by the local media.

Music career 
Malar’s career started in 2004 with the recording of his debut single Sexsational. Originally it was recorded without any professional intent, but the EMP label was so impressed it decided to offer Malar a record deal and officially release the single. Played enthusiastically by Czech and Slovak radio stations, it became a no. 1 hit song in both countries and the most aired song in the Czech Republic for the year 2004. Besides that, Sexsational became the most downloaded ringtone in the country in 2004.

Malar was immediately labeled by the media as the first successful Czech R&B artist. The debut album Sexsational was released a year later including more top 5 singles, such as Twist It Up, If Last Night Was Our Last Night and Gravitate. The album was written by two big US songwriters and producers: Michael Jay (Martika, Eminem, Celine Dion, Kylie Minogue, Jon Secada, Top Gun OST) and Jorge Corante (Deborah Cox, Fat Joe, Janet Jackson, Paula Abdul, K-Ci & Jojo, Scary Movie 3 OST, Adina Howard

In 2006, Malar collaborated for the first time with a Czech artist: Headdy, one of Czech’s top rappers and member of the legendary band DeFuckTo. Together they wrote two hit singles, All Nite and Dancin’ Machine, combining rap and R&B successfully on a mainstream level for the first time in the Czech Republic. At the same time, Malar began his first collaboration with American rapper Nironic, with whom he recorded the hit single Lady in 2007. These were the beginnings of Malar’s songwriting career.

In August 2007, Malar signed a publishing contract with EMI Publishing in the Czech Republic as a songwriter and lyricist. Following the EMI deal a very successful collaboration with the popular dance act Verona was launched. The first single Malar wrote lyrics to, You Gotta Move On, has become a no. 1 hit and one of the most aired singles in the Czech Republic, Slovakia and other radio stations across Europe and Asia. Other singles that topped the charts in the Czech Republic and abroad soon followed.

Malar further showed his abilities as a lyricist on the debut album Vzducholod by the Czech pop act Le Monde. The song Another Chance, which Malar wrote the words to, made it to the finals of the Czech Eurovision contest.

In January 2009, after having spent two years in Los Angeles, Malar returned to the Czech Republic to perform along with rapper Nironic as an opening act for US rap star Ice Cube in Prague. At the end of 2009, Malar was introduced to David Steel, a controversial Czech gangster rapper, a meeting that marked the beginning of a brand new era in Malar's career. Shortly afterwards Malar signed a record deal with Mafia Records, a successful and respected hip-hop label in the Czech Republic. Since then David Steel and Tom Malar have been performing and working together, combining hard street rap with mellow soul and R&B melodies.

In September 2010, Malar topped the Czech charts once more with Moje ex featuring on Czech rap icon Jay Diesel’s single. A month later he appeared with David Steel at a big hip-hop event opening for the legendary rapper and actor Ja Rule. In the fall of 2011 the long-awaited English album by the dance act Verona was released. Malar wrote most of the lyrics to this album.

Spring 2012 saw the biggest commercial success in Malar’s songwriting career so far. Verona released the chart topping Hey Boy, which became a no. 1 hit song in several countries across Europe. It became the theme song to the Czech blockbuster movie Libas jako dabel and was used in several TV commercials.

Aside from his music aspirations, Malar has hosted several TV shows, starred in a few theater pieces and hosted his own radio show.

In March 2014 Malar has signed an exclusive worldwide record deal in Germany with 7us media group  under the 7soul division. His second studio album MALAR&B will be released in July 2014.

Discography

Studio albums 
 2005: Sexsational
 2014: MALAR&B

References

External links 
 

21st-century Czech male singers
Czech songwriters
1980 births
Living people